Secret Son is the 2009 novel by Moroccan-American writer Laila Lalami. The novel is a bildungsroman that follows its main character, a Muslim youth named Youssef El Mekki, as he comes of age in the Casablanca slums.

Development
Like other Arab-American novels, it focuses on themes related to class, gender, religion,  migration/immigration and cultural conflict,  with a particular emphasis on the cultural conflict that leads to radicalization of terrorists. Critic Steven Salaita compared the novel to Anouar Majid's Si Yussef. Lalami chose to write the novel in her third language: English, choosing not to use her first two languages: French and Arabic.

Reception
The New York Times gave the novel a moderately good review saying that "Secret Son is a nuanced depiction of the roots of Islamic terrorism, written by someone who intimately knows one of the stratified societies where it grows" but "Her English prose, although clean and closely observed, lacks music, and her similes can be predictable".

References

Further reading

Arab-American novels
2009 American novels
Novels set in Morocco
American bildungsromans
Novels by Laila Lalami
2009 debut novels
Moroccan American
Algonquin Books books